Corey Flintoff (born April 8, 1946) is a retired journalist. Among his positions was international correspondent based in Moscow for National Public Radio (NPR) for four years.

Early life and education
Flintoff was born in Fairbanks, Alaska.

He earned a bachelor's degree from University of California at Berkeley and a master's degree from University of Chicago (where one of his professors was Norman Maclean).

Career
Flintoff's broadcasting career began in Bethel, Alaska, at the bilingual (English-Yup'ik Eskimo) station KYUK. He spent many years as a newscaster and reporter at the Alaska Public Radio Network before joining NPR in 1990, where he was a newscaster.

In 2007, Flintoff was included in a report compiled by MSNBC of journalists who had made campaign contributions to political candidates. A 2003 contribution of $538 to Howard Dean made their list. Flintoff insists that his wife made the contribution from a joint account. In spite of the error, Flintoff stated that it led to policy reforms at NPR.

Flintoff retired in October 2016.

Personal life
Corey Flintoff is married to Diana Derby. They have a daughter, Claire Flintoff.

Notes and references

External links
 CoreyFlintoff on twitter.com
 Biography at npr.org

1946 births
Living people
American public radio personalities
People from Fairbanks, Alaska
University of Chicago alumni
University of California, Berkeley alumni
20th-century American journalists
American male journalists